Pi Kappa Lambda is an American honor society for undergraduate students, graduate students, and professors of music.  There are over 270 chapters nationally; a complete roster of current chapters is listed in the organization's official web site. The Society is governed by a Board of Regents; President Mark Reimer (Christopher Newport University Department of Music) Vice President Eileen Hayes (University of Wisconsin-Whitewater); and an executive director, Mark Lochstampfor. The National Office is currently located in Saint Simons Island, Georgia.

History
Pi Kappa Lambda was established on May 17, 1918, at the Northwestern University by Carl Milton Beecher, Louis Norton Dodge, and Walter Allen Stults. The first member was Peter Christian Lutkin, Dean of the School of Music at Northwestern University, and the Greek letters chosen for the name of the society were based on his initials.

Pi Kappa Lambda joined the Association of College Honor Societies in 1940. Its current national headquarters are located in Saint Simons Island, GA.

Activities
The society is dedicated to the promotion of music education in institutions of higher learning.  It selects and honors men and women at the upper undergraduate and graduate levels who have demonstrated superior musical and academic achievement at the institutions where the society maintains chapters.

It holds a biennial national convention in even-numbered years, sometimes in conjunction with other organizations.

It also sponsors the publication of a series of monographs on American music, grants scholarships and certificates of honor to outstanding freshmen and sophomore students, holds composition contests, and provides other services in its program of activities.

Footnotes

References

External links

Pi Kappa Lambda Records, Northwestern University Archives, Evanston, Illinois
Peter Christian Lutkin Papers, Northwestern University Archives, Evanston, Illinois
  ACHS Pi Kappa Lambda entry
  Pi Kappa Lambda chapter list at ACHS

Association of College Honor Societies
Honor societies
Student organizations established in 1918
1940 establishments in Illinois